Boo-Boo Bear is a Hanna-Barbera cartoon character on The Yogi Bear Show. Boo-Boo is an anthropomorphic dwarf bear who wears a blue bowtie. Boo-Boo is Yogi Bear's constant companion (not his son, as sometimes believed), and often acts as his conscience. He tries (usually unsuccessfully) to keep Yogi from doing things he should not do, and also to keep Yogi from getting into trouble with Ranger Smith – often saying, "Mr. Ranger isn't gonna like this, Yogi." It is not readily apparent whether Boo-Boo is a juvenile bear with a precocious intellect, or simply an adult bear who is short of stature.

History

Hanna-Barbera appearances
Boo-Boo first appeared along with Yogi in the "Yogi Bear" segment of The Huckleberry Hound Show in 1958; when Yogi was given his own series in 1961, Boo-Boo went with him.

Since then, Boo-Boo has remained at Yogi's side through almost all of the Hanna-Barbera series, movies, and specials in which Yogi appeared, the only exceptions being Yogi's Space Race and Galaxy Goof-Ups, in which Boo-Boo's place was taken by a new character named Scare Bear. Boo-Boo's classic voice actor was Don Messick who also voiced Ranger Smith.

Other appearances
 Throughout the 1990s, Boo-Boo (voiced by Jeff Bergman and Billy West) usually appeared with Yogi in various Cartoon Network commercials and bumpers.
 In the Dexter's Laboratory episode "Chubby Cheese", an animatronic Boo-Boo can be seen on stage playing the trumpet with other Hanna-Barbera characters.
 Boo-Boo appears in the I Am Weasel episode "I Am My Lifetime", voiced by Tom Kenny.
 Spümcø has made a few parody cartoons starring Boo-Boo and other characters from the original Yogi Bear series, starting with 1999's Boo Boo Runs Wild. In this half-hour tale, Boo-Boo's nice-guy persona is heavily satirized with him simply being repressed by all of Ranger Smith's rules and regulations, and finds him regressing into a primal state, complete with typical bear-like urges and mannerisms. He was voiced by John Kricfalusi.
 Boo-Boo appears with Yogi Bear in The Grim Adventures of Billy & Mandy episode "Here Thar Be Dwarves!", voiced by Tom Kenny. He later appears in the episode "Irwin Gets a Clue" as one of several Hanna-Barbera characters to be run into by Hoss Delgado's truck.
 Boo-Boo appears in the Yogi Bear feature voiced by singer/actor Justin Timberlake. In the film, he has a pet frog-mouthed turtle named Turtle, and must help Yogi save Jellystone (and Turtle) from Mayor R. Brown.
 Boo-Boo appears with Yogi Bear in the Harvey Birdman, Attorney at Law episode "Death by Chocolate", voiced by Tom Kenny and in other episodes in cameos.
 Boo-Boo appears in the HBO Max series Jellystone!, voiced by show creator C. H. Greenblatt. Boo-Boo is a nurse in the series.
 On May 10, 2021, Boo-Boo and Yogi appeared in a commercial advertisement for GEICO stealing food from a family cookout in "bear country".
 Boo-Boo along with Yogi Bear appears in the 2021 film Space Jam: A New Legacy. They were among the Warner Bros. characters that were making their way to the site of the basketball game between the Tune Squad and the Goon Squad.

Portrayers
From the time of the character's debut until 1996, the character was voiced by Don Messick who died in 1997.

In the Yogi Bear film, the character is voiced by singer/actor Justin Timberlake.

Scott Innes performed the voice  Boo Boo along with Yogi Bear in At Picnic, Forest, and Honey Lesson.

Animated media

Television shows
 The Huckleberry Hound Show (1958–1960)
 The Yogi Bear Show (1961–1962)
 Yogi Bear & Friends (1967–1968)
 Yogi's Gang (1973)
 Laff-A-Lympics (1977–1979)
 Yogi's Treasure Hunt (1985–1986)
 The New Yogi Bear Show (1988)
 Wake, Rattle, and Roll (1990–1991)
 Yo Yogi! (1991)
 Boo Boo Runs Wild and A Day in the Life of Ranger Smith (1999)
 Boo Boo and the Man (2002)
 Jellystone! (2021-present)

Films and specials
 Hey There, It's Yogi Bear! (1964) (singing voice by Ernie Newton)
 Yogi's Ark Lark (1972)
 Casper's First Christmas (1979)
 Yogi's First Christmas (1980)
 Yogi Bear's All Star Comedy Christmas Caper (1982)
 Yogi's Great Escape (1987)
 Yogi Bear and the Magical Flight of the Spruce Goose (1987)
 Yogi and the Invasion of the Space Bears (1988)
 The Good, the Bad, and Huckleberry Hound (1988)
 Hanna-Barbera's 50th: A Yabba Dabba Doo Celebration (1989)
 Yogi the Easter Bear (1994)
 Arabian Nights (1994) (final time voiced by Don Messick)
 Yogi Bear a live-action/animated film released in 3-D on December 17, 2010 (voiced by Justin Timberlake)
 Space Jam: A New Legacy (2021)

Video games
 Yogi Bear: Great Balloon Blast (2000)
 Yogi Bear: The Video Game (2010)

See also
 List of Hanna-Barbera characters
 List of Yogi Bear characters
 Yogi Bear (disambiguation)
 The Yogi Bear Show
 The New Yogi Bear Show
 Yogi's Gang
 Yogi's Treasure Hunt
 Yo Yogi!

References

External links
 Don Markstein's Toonopedia – Yogi Bear at Toonopedia
 The Cartoon Scrapbook – Profile on Yogi Bear

Child characters in television
Child characters in animated television series
Male characters in television
Male characters in animation
Yogi Bear characters
Hanna-Barbera characters
Fictional bears
Fictional children
Fictional thieves
Television sidekicks
Fictional anthropomorphic characters
Forests in fiction
Television characters introduced in 1958